Chang Gung University (CGU) is a private university in Guishan District, Taoyuan City, Taiwan.

History 
The institution was established as the Chang Gung Medical College in April 1987. Engineering and management students have been accepted since 1993, when the name was changed to Chang Gung College of Medicine and Technology. In July 1997, the name was changed again to Chang Gung University.

In February 2011 Chang Gung University and Arizona State University established an international Biosignatures Center aimed at the prevention, early detection, diagnosis, and treatment of cancer and other diseases. The center will be directed by Arizona State University Nobel laureate Leland H. Hartwell.

The Formosa Plastics Group Museum is on campus.

Colleges and departments

Academic rankings

Chang Gung University was ranked 498th in the 2011 Performance Ranking of Scientific Papers for World Universities.

According to the 2011 Performance Ranking of Scientific Papers for World Universities announced by the Higher Education Evaluation and Accreditation Council of Taiwan, Chang Gung University achieved a fantastic result. Closely following National Taiwan University, National Cheng Kung University, National Jiao Tong University, National Tsing Hua University, and National Yang Ming University, it is the only private university among the six domestic universities which made it into the world's top 500.

In the specialized field of clinical medicine, Chang Gung University was ranked the world's 255th. In the science stream, CGU's electrical engineering research was ranked the world's 290th.

See also
 List of universities in Taiwan

References

External links 

1987 establishments in Taiwan
Educational institutions established in 1987
Formosa Plastics Group
Universities and colleges in Taoyuan City
Universities and colleges in Taiwan
Comprehensive universities in Taiwan